The 2020 Basketball Champions League (BCL) Final Eight was the 4th Basketball Champions League tournament. It was the concluding phase of the 2019–20 Basketball Champions League season. Due to the COVID-19 pandemic and the following suspension of the league, the usual format of Final Four was changed to Final Eight. The tournament was played behind closed doors.

Venue
The O.A.C.A. Olympic Indoor Hall hosted the final tournament for the second time, having already hosted the 2018.

Bracket

Quarterfinals

Semifinals

Third place game

Final

Notes

References

External links 
 Basketball Champions League (official website)

2019–20 Basketball Champions League
Basketball Champions League Final Eight
Basketball Champions League Final Eight